The Thoroughbred Aftercare Alliance Stakes, is a Grade II American Thoroughbred horse race for three-year-olds and up, and contested on dirt at usually at a distance of  miles. The race has a purse of US$350,000. It is run as part of the undercard for the Friday card of the Breeders' Cup.

Race history
The race was originally established in 2008 as part of the annual Breeders' Cup World Championships with its inaugural running on October 25, 2008 at a distance of  miles as the Breeders' Cup Marathon. The inaugural running took place on the second day of the Breeders' Cup on the Pro-Ride synthetic dirt at the 2008 host track, Santa Anita Park in Arcadia, California.

In 2009, the distance was extended by 2 furlongs to  miles.

Due to technical requirements, the race was not eligible for classification as a graded stakes race in its first two runnings. It received Grade III status effective in 2010. The race was upgraded to Grade II status for 2011. The race was originally run under Weight for Age conditions.

Removal from Breeders' Cup
On April 25, 2014, the Breeders' Cup announced that the Marathon would be discontinued. The event was renamed to the Marathon Stakes as an undercard Breeders' Cup stakes race. The purse of the event was reduced from $500,000 to $200,000. The first year, the race was sponsored by the Las Vegas Tourism Board. The event's conditions were changed to Set Weights with allowances.

Citing that "the conditions of the race have not developed into a competition that we believe reaches the standard set by the remaining races comprising the Championships", the Breeders' Cup Committee announced its discontinuation.

However, the venue that holds the Breeders' Cup has been running the event with separate sponsorship. 

In 2020 the event was renamed to the Thoroughbred Aftercare Alliance Stakes,  sponsors since 2017.

Records

Margins:
 lengths – Cary Street (2014)

Most wins:
 2 – Rocketry (2018, 2020)

Most wins by a jockey:
2 – John R. Velazquez (2010, 2017)
2 – Joel Rosario (2015, 2018)

Most wins by a trainer:
 2 – Brendan P. Walsh (2014, 2016)
 2 – James Jerkens (2018, 2020)

Most wins by an owner:
 2 – Centennial Farms (2018, 2020)

Winners

Legend:

 
 

Notes:

† New track record

See also
Breeders' Cup Marathon "top three finishers" and starters
Breeders' Cup World Thoroughbred Championships
American thoroughbred racing top attended events
List of American and Canadian Graded races

References

Graded stakes races in the United States
Grade 2 stakes races in the United States
Horse races in the United States
Marathon
Open long distance horse races
Recurring sporting events established in 2008